Raymond John Funk (born 13 February 1948) was a Member of Parliament (MP) in the House of Commons of Canada from Saskatchewan. He represented Prince Albert—Churchill River and was a member of the New Democratic Party. Funk won his seat in the 1988 election. He easily defeated Progressive Conservative Party of Canada candidate J.J. Cennon with 17,915 votes (almost 9,000 more than Cennon).

Funk was born in Saskatoon, Saskatchewan. As a politician, Funk was heavily involved in peace issues. Funk addressed the United Nations in 1990 on East Timor. He was only the second Canadian MP to do so. In 1993, Funk tabled C-414, a bill that would have established a "Peace Fund" for taxpayers who did not want their money going to the military. The bill "died on the order paper" when the House of Commons was dissolved two days before debate was set to begin on the bill.

Funk made an unsuccessful run in 1997 to return to the House of Commons. Funk came in second in the new riding of Prince Albert. He received 10,418 votes (31.7%), 2,090 votes behind Reform Party candidate Derek Konrad. He ran again in Churchill River in the 2000 election. He was again unsuccessful, coming in third with 5,141 votes. Liberal Rick Laliberte won the seat.

In 2001, Funk supported Buckley Belanger in his unsuccessful run to lead the Saskatchewan New Democratic Party. He also endorsed Bill Blaikie the NDP leadership election in 2003. Funk now is a managing partner of the Spruce River Research Farm near Prince Albert, Saskatchewan. In 2005, he was a recipient of the Saskatchewan Centennial Medal.

Electoral record

References

External links

Members of the House of Commons of Canada from Saskatchewan
New Democratic Party MPs
Politicians from Saskatoon
Living people
1948 births